Alien Oceans: The Search for Life in the Depths of Space is a 2020 non-fiction book by American writer and scientist Kevin Peter Hand. The book explores the possibility of life on planets and moons with subsurface oceans, and argues that the common understanding of the habitable zone should include natural satellites around gas giants. Satellites discussed in the book include Europa, Enceladus, and Triton.

Hand wrote the book to make the scientific information it discusses readily accessible to the public.

References

2020 non-fiction books
Books about extraterrestrial life
Astronomy books
American non-fiction books
Princeton University Press books